This article covers streets in Los Angeles between and including 1st Street and 10th Street. Major streets have their own linked articles; minor streets are discussed here.

These streets run parallel to each other, roughly east–west.

Streets change from west to east (for instance West 1st Street to East 1st Street) at Main Street.

All of these streets run through Downtown Los Angeles.  In addition, many of the streets also run through Westlake and Boyle Heights. 

1st, 4th, 6th/Whittier, 7th, and Olympic have crossings over the Los Angeles River; the others do not.

Details

See also
Los Angeles streets, 11–40
Los Angeles streets, 41–250
Los Angeles avenues
List of streets in Los Angeles

References

01
Los Angeles 01
Streets 01